John Keefe Cato (born May 6, 1958) is a former Major League Baseball (MLB) relief pitcher who played for the Cincinnati Reds in 1983 and 1984.

Biography
A native of Yonkers, New York, Cato graduated from Fairfield University, where he played college baseball for the Stags and holds many Fairfield pitching records including seven career shutouts and one no-hitter. In 1978, he played collegiate summer baseball with the Harwich Mariners of the Cape Cod Baseball League. He was the first Fairfield athlete to play in a major professional sport on the major league level after being selected by the Cincinnati Reds in the second round of the 1979 Major League Baseball Draft.

Sources

External links

Keefe Cato at Baseball Almanac
Pura Pelota

1958 births
Living people
African-American baseball players
Baseball players from New York (state)
Billings Mustangs players
Cincinnati Reds players
Fairfield Stags baseball players
Fairfield University alumni
Harwich Mariners players
Indianapolis Indians players
Las Vegas Stars (baseball) players
Major League Baseball pitchers
Memphis Chicks players
Omaha Royals players
Sportspeople from Yonkers, New York
Tampa Tarpons (1957–1987) players
Tigres de Aragua players
American expatriate baseball players in Venezuela
Waterbury Reds players
Wichita Aeros players
21st-century African-American people
20th-century African-American sportspeople
People from Valhalla, New York